The European Conference of Postal and Telecommunications Administrations (CEPT) was established on June 26, 1959,  by nineteen European states in Montreux, Switzerland,  as a coordinating body for European state telecommunications and postal organizations. The acronym comes from the French version of its name Conférence européenne des administrations des postes et des télécommunications.

CEPT was responsible for the creation of the European Telecommunications Standards Institute (ETSI) in 1988.

CEPT is organised into three main components:
 Electronic Communications Committee (ECC) - responsible for radiocommunications and telecommunications matters and formed by the merger of ECTRA (European Committee for Telecommunications Regulatory Affairs) and ERC (European Radiocommunications Committee) in September 2001
The permanent secretariat of the ECC is the European Communications Office (ECO)
 European Committee for Postal Regulation (CERP, after the French "Comité européen des régulateurs postaux") - responsible for postal matters
 The committee for ITU Policy (Com-ITU) is responsible for organising the co-ordination of CEPT actions for the preparation for and during the course of the ITU activities meetings of the council, Plenipotentiary Conferences, World Telecommunication Development Conferences, World Telecommunication Standardisation Assemblies

Member countries
As of March 2019: 48 countries. 

Albania, Andorra, Austria, Azerbaijan,  Belgium, Bosnia and Herzegovina, Bulgaria, Croatia, Cyprus, Czech Republic, Denmark, Estonia, Finland, France, Georgia, Germany, Greece, Hungary, Iceland, Ireland, Italy, Latvia, Liechtenstein, Lithuania, Luxembourg, Malta, Moldova, Monaco, Montenegro, Netherlands, North Macedonia, Norway, Poland, Portugal, Romania, San Marino, Serbia, Slovak Republic, Slovenia, Spain, Sweden, Switzerland, Turkey, Ukraine, United Kingdom, Vatican City.  The Russian Federation and Belarus memberships were suspended indefinitely on March 17, 2022.

See also
 Europa postage stamp
 CEPT Recommendation T/CD 06-01 (standard for videotex)
 E-carrier (standard for multiplexed telephone circuits)
 International Telecommunication Union
 LPD433
 PMR446
 SRD860
 Universal Postal Union
 WiMAX
 African Telecommunications Union (ATU)
 Asia-Pacific Telecommunity (APT)
 Caribbean Postal Union (CPU)
 Caribbean Telecommunications Union (CTU)
 Inter-American Telecommunication Commission (CITEL)
 Postal Union of the Americas, Spain and Portugal

Notes

External links

ECC website
ECO website
CERP website
Com-ITU website

Communications in Europe
International telecommunications
Organizations based in Copenhagen
Organizations established in 1959
Pan-European trade and professional organizations
Postal organizations
Universal Postal Union